Manuel Marani (born 7 June 1984) is a retired football player from San Marino, who last played for S.S. Murata and formerly for the San Marino national football team.

Career
Notably, he scored a late equalizer for San Marino against the Republic of Ireland on 7 February 2007. The goal nearly earned San Marino what would have been their greatest result, namely their third score draw in a competitive match and their second against a high-ranking team (the first came against Turkey, second against Latvia). However, Stephen Ireland scored a winner for the visitors just seconds before the end of injury time. He is also one of two people to have scored more than one goal for San Marino, the other being Andy Selva.

International goals

References

External links

Sammarinese footballers
San Marino international footballers
People from Serravalle (San Marino)
Living people
1984 births
S.S. Murata players
S.P. Tre Fiori players
Association football forwards